HICS or Hawaii Inter-Island Cable System is a fiber optic submarine telecommunications cable system linking together six of the eight main Hawaiian Islands with each other.

It has landing points in:

 Lihue Terminal, Wailua Point, Kauai, Hawaii, U.S.A.
 Ko Olina Terminal, Kahe Point, Oahu, Hawaii, U.S.A.
 Koko Head Terminal, Sandy Beach, Oahu, Hawaii, U.S.A.
 Kihei Terminal, Mokapu, Maui, Hawaii, U.S.A.
 Kawaihae Terminal, Spencer Beach, Island of Hawaii, U.S.A.

It has a transmission capacity of 2.5 Gbit/s, and a total cable length of 298 miles (480 km). It started operation on July 20, 1994, and is operated and maintained by Hawaiian Telcom.

References 

Submarine communications cables in the Pacific Ocean
Infrastructure completed in 1994
1994 establishments in Hawaii